Kate Durbin is an American, Los Angeles, California-based writer, digital and performance artist. She is the author of several books of fiction and poetry including E! Entertainment, ABRA, The Ravenous Audience, and Hoarders. Durbin's work primarily centers around popular culture and digital media, exploring the way the Internet, reality TV, and social media affect society and the human condition. She has called popular culture the subject matter of her work, as well as her artistic material.

Of Durbin's writing, Christopher Higgs wrote for HTML Giant, "I call Kate Durbin one of the most compelling contemporary American writers because I feel like she's in her own lane. No one does what she does in the way that she does it."

Books
The Ravenous Audience, a collection of poetry that utilizes a wide variety of forms, was selected by Chris Abani for the Black Goat imprint of Akashic Books. The book deals with coming of age via a variety of media, from poems based on the films of Catherine Breillat to rewrites of archetypal figures such as Gretel, Little Red Riding Hood, Marilyn Monroe, Amelia Earhart, Jezebel, and Clara Bow. In a review for Rain Taxi, Johannes Goransson called the book "iconophilic, starving...a poetics of Plath-influenced engagement with the peanut crunching crowd." Poet Juan Felipe Herrera called it "a brutal tour de force."

E! Entertainment, Durbin's second book, consists of short stories crafted from meticulous notes on reality television shows revolving around Hollywood, women, class and lifestyle themes. Some of the shows in Durbin's book are Keeping Up with the Kardashians, Real Housewives of Beverly Hills, and MTV's The Hills. Durbin calls the book's format "literary television, a genre unto itself." E! Entertainment also explores the courtroom trials of Lindsay Lohan, Amanda Knox, and Anna Nicole Smith. Nylon magazine said of the book: "Durbin elevates petty O.C. arguments between Lauren Conrad and Heidi Montag to the status of serious literature." Heidi Montag praised the book, calling Durbin "pop culture's stenographer."

Her third book of poetry, Hoarders, continues her work with reality TV. It is forthcoming from Wave Books in 2021. Hoarders examines the reality TV show of the same name and deals with the topics of consumerism, environmentalism, and trauma. According to the book's description, Hoarders is "written in a Mad Lib-style language...wherein each poem is a portrait of a person and the objects they hoard, from Barbies to plants to food to books and more. Using reality television as a medium, Durbin explores an uncanny space of attachments that reflects a cultural moment back to the reader in ways that are surreal, tender, and sorrowful." Rich Smith from the Stranger writes: "Though the swift-moving spectacle of the television show invites viewers to cast easy judgment on these hoarders, Durbin employs poetry's slower speed to show a more complicated picture. Instead of using Tara's story to make us feel better about ourselves for not being hoarders, she indicts aspects of American culture we all participate in—religion, capitalism—and reveals our complicity, all while dropping a lot of sight gags in the process." Alyse Burnside writes in the Atlantic: "Durbin’s work has what the A&E show lacks: a capacious sense of humanity, a nuanced understanding of how consumerism might shape compulsions, and a deeply expressed empathy for the subtleties of life under capitalism…In this reinvention, each character’s own narration takes precedence over the more salacious details of their disorder, bringing us into their personal, sometimes painful, worlds. Each poem consists of connected fragments, little piles. Each stanza reads like a conversation between the person and their stuff…The poems themselves are cluttered, yet their vibrancy is hard to overstate. Durbin astutely marries content and meaning, overwhelming the reader while dialing into our internal monstrous consumer.”

Performance art and video art
Durbin's performance project Hello Selfie explored gender and the selfie phenomenon. The performance took place "IRL," in a public setting such as a mall or art fair, and online, simultaneously. Durbin called it "passive aggressive performance art," because the performers ignored the audience, taking selfies constantly and uploading them to the Facebook event wall. The three iterations with women performers wearing underwear, colorful wigs, and Hello Kitty stickers, took place in Miami at the Pulse Art Fair, Union Square with Transfer Gallery, and Perform Chinatown in Chinatown Los Angeles. The iteration with men in no shirts and pants took place in Brisbane Australia in collaboration with Arts Queensland. Hello Selfie received critical attention in The New York Times, Public Art Dialogue, and elsewhere; it was featured in the show Body Anxiety curated by Leah Schrager and Jennifer Chan as well as a number of international and national art exhibitions in galleries and museums.

Durbin's performance/video art work "Unfriend Me Now!" debuted at Spring Break Art Fair in Los Angeles in 2018. Taking inspiration from Facebook's role in increasing polarization, it features a character called Facebook Clown, who is a representation of "Facebook becoming flesh." Durbin claims that Facebook contacted her twice in the months after she posted this work on Facebook, asking her to come into their headquarters to speak to them about Facebook. She did not reply to them.

Internet-based projects
Durbin founded the online critical journal Gaga Stigmata: Critical Writings and Art about Lady Gaga in 2010, which ended its run in 2013. The blog critically engaged with Lady Gaga's "shock pop phenomenon" and "moved at the speed of pop," responding to pop cultural phenomenon almost instantly after they occurred, a way of doing criticism that was new at the time. Gaga Stigmata received considerable press attention from sources as diverse as NPR, CBC's Q, Yale's American Scholar Magazine, AOL, The Atlantic, Spex, Huffington Post, Pop Matters, Berfrois, Voice Tribune, and many others. Members of Gaga's team, including Nicola Formichetti, hair stylist Frederic “Freddie” Aspiras, and visual artist Millie Brown have also tweeted and praised Gaga Stigmata'''s work. The journal has been used as a resource in classrooms across the world, and has been studied at conferences as a phenomenon in its own right, as a new way to do criticism in the era of the internet."Get Your PhD in Lady Gaga." Salon.com

Personal life
Durbin has spoken about her childhood upbringing in restrictive fundamentalist Christianity, where she was pulled out of school to homeschool, although she says she "did not do much schoolwork" and was "a feral child." It was during her childhood that she became interested in popular culture as a "window into the world" outside her home.

In an interview with JoAnna Novak at the Los Angeles Review of Books, Durbin shared that part of her inspiration for writing her book Hoarders, about the reality TV show, was her family's experience with hoarding, substance abuse, and mental illness.</ref>

Selected worksHoarders.Seattle, WA. Wave Books. 2021 E! Entertainment. Brooklyn, NY. Wonder. 2014 Kept Women." 2012. 
The Ravenous Audience. New York. Akashic. 2009. 
Fragments Found in a 1937 Aviator's Boot. Chicago, Ill. Dancing Girl Press. 2009.
ABRA. Center for Book and Paper Arts. Chicago, Ill. (iPad app and artist's book).

References

External links
 "Elena Gomez Interviews Kate Durbin" Cordite Poetry Review. 
 "Well covered poetry bonanza." New Yorker.
 video of Kate Durbin reading at BESHT Gallery.
 Kate Durbin curates YouTube for MOCA

Living people
Performance art in Los Angeles
American women poets
21st-century American poets
21st-century American women writers
Year of birth missing (living people)